Ranoidea robinsonae is a species of frog in the subfamily Pelodryadinae, endemic to Papua New Guinea.

The skin of the dorsum mostly green in color with pale stripes.  Three adult male frogs were found to measure 28.3-28.7 mm in snout-vent length.  Some of these frogs have dark spots.

Scientists place this frog in the same species group as the dainty green tree frog.

References

robinsonae
Amphibians described in 2008
Frogs of Asia